Geoffrey K. Martin is a mathematician currently advising in the field of mathematical physics.  Martin is also the Associate Professor and Chair of the mathematics department at the University of Toledo.  His fields of study include differential geometry, relativity, and the foundations of physics.  Martin earned his Ph.D. at the Stony Brook University in 1983. Geoffrey is the son of horticulturists Joy Lee Martin and Ernest Martin who owned Logee's Greenhouses.

External links
 University of Toledo, Department of Mathematics, Faculty Directory
 University of Toledo, Department of Mathematics, Faculty Research Interests
 

Year of birth missing (living people)
Living people
20th-century American mathematicians
21st-century American mathematicians
Differential geometers
University of Toledo faculty
Stony Brook University alumni
Mathematicians from Ohio